George Green's School is a coeducational secondary school and sixth form, located in Cubitt Town on the Isle of Dogs in the London Borough of Tower Hamlets, England.

History
The school was founded in 1828 by George Green, a shipbuilder and shipwright. It was originally located on East India Dock Road. A maritime connection with the school has been maintained since then. In 1883, the school moved from the original buildings to new premises which provided places for 200 boys and 200 girls, in separate classrooms. The pupils paid modest fees or were assisted with scholarships. Later it became a LCC maintained school and was the first to institute co-education. It remained open until 1979 when it became part of Tower Hamlets College. Today it is a voluntary controlled school supported by the Worshipful Company of Shipwrights. It has a comprehensive intake of pupils, and is administered by Tower Hamlets London Borough Council.

Grammar school
It was a voluntary-controlled coeducational grammar school located on East India Dock Road Poplar.

Comprehensive
In 1975 it became a comprehensive, moving to a new site on the Isle of Dogs.

Admissions
George Green's School offers GCSEs and vocational courses as programmes of study for pupils, while students in the sixth form have the option to study from a range of A Levels and the IB Diploma Programme.

Notable former pupils

George Green's Grammar School

 Prof Roderic Alfred Gregory CBE FRS, George Holt Professor of Physiology from 1948 to 1981 at the University of Liverpool, who studied gastrin
 Prof Kenneth Harrap CBE, Professor of Biochemical Pharmacology from 1984 to 1997
 Sam Lesser, Daily Worker/Morning Star journalist, veteran of the International Brigades during the Spanish Civil War.
 John Scurr, Labour MP

George Green's Comprehensive
 Jane Martinson, journalist on The Guardian

References

External links
George Green's School official website

Secondary schools in the London Borough of Tower Hamlets
Voluntary controlled schools in London
International Baccalaureate schools in England
Millwall